Bulgaria competed at the 1976 Winter Olympics in Innsbruck, Austria. It did not earn any medals.

Alpine skiing

Men

Biathlon

Men

 1 One minute added per close miss (a hit in the outer ring), two minutes added per complete miss.

Cross-country skiing

Men

Men's 4 × 10 km relay

Ice hockey

First round
Winners (in bold) entered the Medal Round. Other teams played a consolation round for 7th-12th places.

|}

Consolation round

Austria 6-2 Bulgaria
Switzerland 8-3 Bulgaria
Yugoslavia 8-5 Bulgaria
Romania 9-4 Bulgaria
Japan 7-5 Bulgaria

References 
 Official Olympic Reports
 Olympic Winter Games 1976, full results by sports-reference.com

Nations at the 1976 Winter Olympics
1976
1976 in Bulgarian sport